Thomas Courtenay Abbott was Archdeacon of Cloyne  from 1919 until 1936.

Dorman was educated at Trinity College, Dublin and ordained in 1878.  After  curacies at Killebban and Cork he held incumbencies at Schull  and  Fermoy before his appointment as Archdeacon.

References

Alumni of Trinity College Dublin
Archdeacons of Cloyne